Texas Instruments TMS320 is a blanket name for a series of digital signal processors (DSPs) from Texas Instruments. It was introduced on April 8, 1983 through the TMS32010 processor, which was then the fastest DSP on the market.

The processor is available in many different variants, some with fixed-point arithmetic and some with floating point arithmetic. The TMS320 processors were fabricated on MOS integrated circuit chips, including both NMOS and CMOS variants. The floating point DSP TMS320C3x, which exploits delayed branch logic, has as many as three delay slots.

The flexibility of this line of processors has led to it being used not merely as a co-processor for digital signal processing but also as a main CPU. Newer implementations support standard IEEE JTAG control for boundary scan and/or in-circuit debugging.

The original TMS32010 and its subsequent variants is an example of a CPU with a modified Harvard architecture, which features separate address spaces for instruction and data memory but the ability to read data values from instruction memory. The TMS32010 featured a fast multiply-and-accumulate operation useful in both DSP applications as well as transformations used in computer graphics.  The graphics controller card for the Apollo Computer DN570 Workstation, released in 1985, was based on the TMS32010 and could transform 20,000 2D vectors every second.

Variants

The TMS320 architecture has been around for a while so a number of product variants have developed. The product codes used by Texas Instruments after the first TMS32010 processor have involved a very popular series of processor named TMS320Cabcd where a is the main series, b the generation and cd is some custom number for a minor sub-variant.

For this reason people working with DSPs often abbreviate a processor as "C5x" when the actual name is something like TMS320C5510, since all products obviously have the name "TMS320" and all processors with "C5" in the name are code compatible and share the same basic features. Sometimes you will even hear people talking about "C55x" and similar subgroupings, since processors in the same series and same generation are even more similar.

The TMS320 processors are fabricated on MOS integrated circuit chips, including both NMOS and CMOS variants.

Legacy series
 TMS320C1x, first generation 16-bit fixed-point DSPs. All processors in these series are code-compatible with the TMS32010.
TMS32010, the very first processor in the first series introduced in 1983, using external memory
TMS320M10, the same processor but with an internal ROM of 3 KB
TMS320C10, TMS320C15, TMS320C25, etc.
TMS320C3x, 32-bit floating point
TMS320C30, 27 to 50 MHz, 8 KB internal SRAM, 5 Volt.
TMS320C31, 27 to 60 MHz, 8 KB internal SRAM, 5 Volt, subset of TMS320C30 by removing 2nd serial port, removing 2nd memory bus, replacing user ROM with factory ROM bootloader.
TMS320LC31, 33 to 40 MHz, 3.3 Volt version of TMS320C31.
TMS320C32, 40 to 60 MHz, 2 KB internal SRAM, 5 Volt, adds 2nd DMA coprocessor, changes external memory bus to allow 8/16/32-bit wide memory access where as other C3x parts are 32-bit only.
TMS320VC33, 60 to 75 MHz, 136 KB internal SRAM, 3.3 Volt I/O with 1.8 Volt Core, superset of TMS320C31 by adding 128KB internal SRAM.
TMS320C4x, 32-bit floating point
TMS320C40, 40/50/60/80 MHz, cycle time 50/40/33/25 ns, CMOS
TMS320C44, subset of TMS320C40
TMS320C8x, multiprocessor chip
TMS320C80 MVP (multimedia video processor) has a 32 bit floating-point "master processor" and four 32-bit fixed-point "slave processors".  In many ways the Cell microprocessor followed this design approach.

C2000 series
 C2000 microcontroller family consists of 32-bit microcontrollers with performance integrated peripherals designed for real-time control applications.  C2000 consists of 5 sub-families: the newer C28x + ARM Cortex M3 series, C28x Delfino floating-point series, C28x Piccolo series, C28x fixed-point series, and C240x, an older 16-bit line that is no longer recommended for new development. The C2000 series is notable for its high performance set of on-chip control peripherals including PWM, ADC, quadrature encoder modules, and capture modules. The series also contains support for I²C, SPI, serial (SCI), CAN, watchdog, McBSP, external memory interface and GPIO. Due to features like PWM waveform synchronization with the ADC unit, the C2000 line is well suited to many real-time control applications. The C2000 family is used for applications like motor drive and control, industrial automation, solar and other renewable energy, server farms, digital power, power-line communications, and lighting. A line of low cost kits are available for key applications including motor control, digital power, solar, and LED lighting.

C5000 series
TMS320C54x 16-bit fixed-point DSP, 6 stage pipeline with in-order-execution of opcodes, parallel load/store on arithmetic operations, multiply accumulate and other DSP enhancements. Internal multi-port memory. no cache unit.
 A popular choice for 2G Software defined cellphone radios, particularly GSM, circa late 1990s when many Nokia and Ericsson cellphones made use of the C54x.
 At the time, desire to improve the user interface of cellphones led to the adoption of ARM7 as a general-purpose processor for user interface and control, off-loading this function from the DSP.  This ultimately led to the creation of a dual core ARM7+C54x DSP, which later evolved into the OMAP product line.
TMS320C55x generation – fixed-point, runs C54x code but adds more internal parallelism (another ALU, dual MAC, more memory bandwidth) and registers, while supporting much lower power operation.
 Today, most C55x DSPs are sold as discrete chips
 OMAP1 chips combine an ARM9 (ARMv5TEJ) with a C55x series DSP.
 OMAP2420 chips combine an ARM11 (ARMv6) with a C55x series DSP.

C6000 series

 TMS320 C6000 series, or TMS320C6x: VLIW-based DSPs
 TMS320C62x fixed-point – 2000 MIPS/1.9 W
 TMS320C67x floating point – code compatible with TMS320C62x
 TMS320C64x fixed-point – code compatible with TMS320C62x
 TMS320C67x+ floating point – architectural update of TMS320C67x
 TMS320C64x+ fixed-point – major architectural update of TMS320C64x
 TMS320C674x fixed- and floating point – merger of C64x+ and C67x+
 TMS320C66x fixed- and floating point – backwards compatible with C674x
 Other parts with C6000 series DSPs include
 DaVinci chips include one or both of an ARM9 and a C64x+ or C674x DSP
 OMAP-L13x chips include an ARM9 (ARMv5TEJ) and a C674x fixed and floating point DSP
 OMAP243x chips combine an ARM11 (ARMv6) with a C64x series DSP
 OMAP3 chips include an ARM Cortex-A8 (ARMv7) with a C64x+ DSP
 OMAP4 and OMAP5 chips include an ARM Cortex-A9 or A15 (ARMv7) with a custom C64x+ derivative known as Tesla (or C64T)

C7000 series

To be released.

DaVinci series
 The DaVinci series started with systems-on-a-chip using an embedded C6000 series (C64x+) DSP, ARM9 application processors, and Digital Media peripherals.  There are variants without ARMs, and without DSPs.  Their marketing focuses on their video processing capabilities.  Original chips supported NTSC and PAL, while newer ones support HDTV.

OMAP variants
 OMAP variants also have an ARM processor in the same chip; see the main article on Texas Instruments OMAP. (There are also OMAP processors with other secondary processors, so these are not necessarily DSPs.)

DA variants
 DA variants (target "Digital audio")
 DA25x is an ARM processor and a C55x core. It has some on-chip peripherals like a USB slave controller and security features. Documentation of this chip is only available after signing a Texas Instruments NDA. These variants are used exclusively in the Creative ZEN and Dell Digital Jukebox MP3 players, as the primary CPU and signal processor for all processing of MP3 data streams.
 TMS320DA7xx Aureus chips are built around C67x+ DSPs
 DA830/DA828 Aureus chips are based on the OMAP-L137, and include a 300 MHz C674x DSP and a 300 MHz ARM926ES-J core.  The DA828 variant has reduced I/O and comes in a 176-pin TQFP package instead of a 256-ball PBGA.
 DA610/601 is a processor  with a C67x core. It has on chip peripherals needed to connect to audio codecs for a 5.1 or 7.1 system. This chip is used in the YAMAHA high end receivers : RX-V1400, RX-V2400, RX-V1600, RX-V2600, RX-V2500.

DM variants
 DM variants:
 DM270 has an ARM7TDMI core and a TMS320 C5409 DSP
 DM320 has an ARM926 core and a TMS320 C5409 DSP
 DSC25 has an ARM7TDMI core and a TMS320 DSP
 Texas Instruments DaVinci chips

Other vendors

General Instrument manufactured the TMS32010 as a second source.

Around 1991 a clone of the TMS320C20 was manufactured by ZMD under the designation U320C20FC.

A number of devices from the TMS320 series are in production at NIIET Voronezh as the 1867 series, including a radiation-hardened version of the TMS320C25 under the designation 1867VM7T. Clones of the TMS320C546 went into production at PKK Milandr Moscow in 2009 under the designation 1967VC1T and in 2016 at MVC Nizhny Novgorod as 1910VM1T. PKK Milandr also manufactures a TMS320C54x with an additional ARM core as the 1901VC1T.

Software support
The TMS320 series can be programmed using C, C++, and/or assembly language. Most work on the TMS320 processors is done using Texas Instruments proprietary toolchain and their integrated development environment Code Composer Studio, which includes a mini operating system called DSP/BIOS. Additionally, a department at the Chemnitz University of Technology has developed preliminary support for the TMS320C6x series in the GNU Compiler Collection.

In November 2007 TI released part of its toolchain as freeware for non-commercial users, offering the bare compiler, assembler, optimizer and linker under a proprietary license. However, neither the IDE nor a debugger were included, so for debugging and JTAG access to the DSPs, users still need to purchase the complete toolchain.

In 2010 Texas Instruments contracted CodeSourcery (the assignment later transferred to Mentor Graphics as part of their acquisition) to provide deep integration and support for the C6x series in GCC, as part of their effort to port the Linux kernel to C6x. This culminated in C6x being a supported architecture in GCC release 4.7 on March 22, 2012.

See also
XDAIS algorithms
 Ceva
 Qualcomm Hexagon

References

External links
DSP product tree at Texas Instruments
Texas Instruments enters the DSP market historical article from TI
C2000 low cost experimenter kits
c6000 Discussion Forum at DSPRelated.com
Linux-C6x a top page for the recent (as of 2012) GCC and Linux ports to C6x
 memoir by T.I. manager on creation of TMS32010 Digital Signal Processor
see Waves of Silence: Digisonix, active noise control, and the digital revolution  for the description of an early commercial application of the TMS32010 for active noise control

Digital signal processors
Texas Instruments microprocessors